Trat Football Club (Thai: สโมสรฟุตบอลจังหวัดตราด) is a Thai professional football club based in Trat province. The club play in Thai League 2.

History
The Trat Football Club formed in 2012, nicknamed The White Elephants. They were admitted to the 2011 Regional League Division 2 Central & Eastern Region. In their first season, they were kicked out of Thai FA Cup after they fielded an unregistered player in their penalty shoot out win over Army United and scraped into 3rd in Central/East division to make Regional league playoffs. Trat was promoted to 2013 Thai Division 1 League as the first attempt after topping Group B.

Honours
Thai League 2:
 Runner-up 2018
Regional League Division 2:
 Runner-up : 2012
Regional League Eastern Division
 Winners : 2016

Stadium and locations

Season-by-season record

P = Played
W = Games won
D = Games drawn
L = Games lost
F = Goals for
A = Goals against
Pts = Points
Pos = Final position

TPL = Thai Premier League

QR1 = First Qualifying Round
QR2 = Second Qualifying Round
QR3 = Third Qualifying Round
QR4 = Fourth Qualifying Round
RInt = Intermediate Round
R1 = Round 1
R2 = Round 2
R3 = Round 3

R4 = Round 4
R5 = Round 5
R6 = Round 6
GR = Group stage
QF = Quarter-finals
SF = Semi-finals
RU = Runners-up
S = Shared
W = Winners
DIS = Disqualified

Players

Out on loan

Managerial history
Coaches by years (2013–present)

 Harnarong Chunhakunakorn 
 Krit Singha-preecha 
 Praphan Narkpong 
 Somkiat Fongpech 
 Worakorn Wichanarong  
 Dusit Chalermsan  
 Phayong Khunnaen  
 Somchai Chuayboonchum  
 Harnarong Chunhakunakorn

References

External links
 Official Website of Trat F.C.
 Official Facebook

Association football clubs established in 2012
Football clubs in Thailand
Trat province
2012 establishments in Thailand